Melges Performance Sailboats, is an American sailboat manufacturer founded by Harry Melges, father of former Olympic sailor Buddy Melges.

Melges Boat Works, Inc. was founded by Harry C. Melges, Sr. in 1945. The company was originally named Mel-Ban Boat Works and became Melges Boatworks in 1948. The company became a leader in scow boat design in the U.S., particularly in the Midwest. Harry, Sr. initially built boats out of wood.

The company's headquarters is in Zenda, Wisconsin. The current CEO is Harry Melges III and President is Andy Burdick.

Reichel/Pugh designed many of the Melges-produced boats, including the Melges 14, 15, 17, 20, 24, 30, and 32.

Boats

Boats produced by the company include:
A Scow
C Scow
E Scow
M-16 Scow
MC Scow
Melges 20
Melges 14
Melges 15
Melges 17
Melges 24
Melges 30
Melges 32
Melges 40
O'Pen Skiff
X Boat

See also 
 List of sailboat designers and manufacturers

References 

 Heart of GLASS, Fiberglass Boats And The Men Who Made Them by Daniel Spurr pages 244 – 250
 The Worlds Best Sailboats Volume II, by Ferenc Máté - - Albatross Publishing House, 2003
 Best Boats to Build or Buy, by Ferenc Máté – Albatross Publishing House, 1982

External links 
 

Melges Performance Sailboats